Sylvia Olden Lee (June 29, 1917 – April 10, 2004) was an American vocal coach and accompanist. She was the first African-American to be employed by the Metropolitan Opera. Her fields of expertise were European classical music and Negro spirituals.

Biography
Lee was born in Meridian, Mississippi. Her father, James Clarence Olden, was a member of the Fisk Quartet, which included Roland Hayes. She studied piano and organ at Howard University and Oberlin Conservatory.

Among the highlights of her career:
 She was invited to play at the White House for the inauguration of Franklin Delano Roosevelt (1933).
 In 1942, she toured with Paul Robeson.
 In 1954, after being hired as vocal coach for the Metropolitan Opera, she was the impetus for the historic invitation to African-American contralto Marian Anderson to perform in Giuseppe Verdi's Un Ballo in Maschera.
 In 1956, she began studies with famed German tenor Gerhard Huesch.

Lee taught at a number of universities, including the Curtis Institute of Music.

Lee's brother was the prominent African-American graphic designer Georg Olden.  In 2017, Lee was commemorated in a concert at Carnegie Hall, sponsored by the Foundation for the Revival of Classical Culture.

References

Further reading
 Sylvia Olden Lee & Elizabeth Nash. The Memoirs of Sylvia Olden Lee: Premier African-American Vocal Coach. Edwin Mellen Press, 2001.

External links
 Obituary
 Celebration of Her Life

1917 births
2004 deaths
Musicians from Meridian, Mississippi
Howard University alumni
Oberlin College alumni
American vocal coaches
20th-century American musicians
20th-century African-American musicians
21st-century African-American people